Joanne Chory is an American plant biologist and geneticist. Chory is a professor and director of the Plant Molecular and Cellular Biology Laboratory, at the Salk Institute for Biological Studies and an investigator of the Howard Hughes Medical Institute.

She leads the Salk Institute’s Harnessing Plants Initiative (HPI), an innovative carbon dioxide removal approach to fight climate change by optimizing a plant’s natural ability to capture and store carbon dioxide and adapt to different climate conditions. Chory and the HPI team aims to help plants grow bigger and stronger root systems that can absorb larger amounts of carbon by burying it in the ground in the form of suberin, a naturally occurring substance.

Considered the most influential plant biologist of the modern era and one of the greatest scientific innovators of our time, Chory's 30 years of work has pioneered the use of molecular genetics to study how plants change their shape and size to optimize photosynthesis and growth for different environments.

Chory was elected as a foreign member of the Royal Society in 2011 and is the recipient of the 2018 Breakthrough Prize in Life Sciences and the 2019 Prince of Asturias Award for Technical and Scientific Research. She holds the Howard H. and Maryam R. Newman Chair in Plant Biology. She is also an adjunct professor in the Section of Cell and Developmental Biology, UC San Diego. Chory and her HPI team received a $35 million award in support of the initiative from the TED Audacious Project in 2019 and another $30 million from the Bezos Earth Fund in 2020.

Biography
Joanne Chory was born in Boston, Massachusetts in 1955. Her Lebanese parents raised her along with her four brothers and one sister. She began her upper level education at Oberlin College in Ohio where she graduated with a degree in biology with honors. She then continued her post graduate education at the University of Illinois Urbana-Champaign. It is here were she received her Ph.D.

She was a postdoctoral fellow at the Harvard Medical School in the lab of Frederick M. Ausubel. In 1988 she joined the Salk Institute as an Assistant Professor. Chory eventually married her husband, Stephen Worland, with whom she has two adopted children.

In 2004, Chory was diagnosed with Parkinson's disease. She has struggled with the disease for well over a decade, but with the help of medications and a brain implant to help regulate her movement, she has continued her genetic research. Along with her passion for genetics, Chory strives to inspire young women to become scientists and is constantly working to improve the field for women.

Chory was not always interested in genetics. Her early career interests were centered in microbiology. Through her research in that field she developed a deeper interest in genetics, specifically research that was being done on Arabidopsis plants. Through her lengthy career in genetics she has been awarded numerous prestigious accolades for her many contributions to the field.

Career and research 
Joanne Chory focuses her research on finding a way to optimize plant growth to sustain a growing human population. She uses Arabidopsis thaliana as a model organism, but her purpose is to optimize all plant growth and not just that of A. thaliana itself. She mutates the genes of the model organism and uses the results to understand the effects that these mutations have. She approaches this information from various directions including using genetics, genomics, cell biology, x-ray crystallography, biochemistry, and ecology. She has made strides in understanding light sensitivity and hormones in these plants. She uses this knowledge to optimize growth in other plants in hopes that we can better sustain a fast and ever-growing population.

Chory shows particular appreciation for manipulation of phenotypes of an organism. Light signals are required for the induction and regulation of many developmental processes in plants. She has participated in research dissecting this complex process by isolating mutations that alter light-regulated seedling development in Arabidopsis. Her work has identified mutants that are deficient in the phytochrome photoreceptors and in nuclear-localized repressors and has also revealed that steroid hormones control light-regulated seedling development. Dr. Chory's lab has been involved in the manipulation of the biosynthetic pathway for these steroids that altered the growth and development of plants and identification of the putative steroid receptor, a transmembrane receptor kinase. Her group has also contributed towards the understanding of chloroplast to nuclear retrograde signaling and plant shade avoidance responses.

Awards and honors

 2020 Pearl Meister Greengard Prize
 2019 Princess of Asturias Award for Technical and Scientific Research 
 2018 Gruber Prize in Genetics
 2018 Breakthrough Prize in Life Sciences
 2015 Elected to the American Philosophical Society
 2012 Genetics Society of America Medal
 2011 Elected Foreign Member of the Royal Society
 2009 Elected Foreign Associate, Académie des Sciences, France
 2008 Member, German Academy of Sciences Leopoldina
 2006 Associate Member, EMBO
 2005 Fellow of the American Association for the Advancement of Science
 2004 Kumho Award in Plant Molecular Biology 
 2003  Scientific American 50: Research Leader in Agriculture
2000  L'Oreal-UNESCO Award for Women in Science
 1999 Elected Member of the U.S. National Academy of Sciences
 1998 Elected Fellow of the American Academy of Arts and Sciences
 1997 Investigator, Howard Hughes Medical Institute
 1995 Charles Albert Schull Award, awarded by American Society of Plant Biologists
 1994 NAS Award for Initiatives in Research

References

External links
Biography and research at the Howard Hughes Medical Institute
Faculty webpage at the Salk Institute for Biological Studies
TED Talk 2019. Joanne Chory: How supercharged plants could slow climent change

1955 births
Living people
21st-century American biologists
Members of the French Academy of Sciences
American people of Lebanese descent
Foreign Members of the Royal Society
Oberlin College alumni
University of Illinois alumni
Harvard Medical School staff
L'Oréal-UNESCO Awards for Women in Science laureates
21st-century American women scientists
Howard Hughes Medical Investigators
Fellows of the American Association for the Advancement of Science
Members of the American Philosophical Society
Members of the United States National Academy of Sciences
Members of the German Academy of Sciences Leopoldina
Salk Institute for Biological Studies people